KULT: The Temple of Flying Saucers is a graphic adventure published  in 1989 by Exxos. The  US version was released as Chamber of the Sci-Mutant Priestess.

Plot
The game is set in a post-apocalyptic environment. Society consists of two races: Tuner; who possess psy-powers and Protozorqs; who are physical mutants.

Raven, a Tuner, is caught prisoner in the temple of the Protozorqs, and must find his girlfriend, who was also kidnapped, to finally proceed to escape with her. Raven is aware that his quest won't be simple since the Protozorqs, armed with "zapsticks", will gladly kill him if he does anything they dislike.

Ports

The Amiga and Atari ST version use digitized sound effects.

The MS-DOS version supports 16-color EGA or Tandy-compatible graphics, 4-color CGA graphics, and 2-color Hercules graphics. Three-voice music is supported on the Tandy.

Reception
Computer Gaming World called the game "an imaginative adventure game" with unusually good graphics and audio. It recommended the game to fans of adventures with puzzles, with the story's short length and abrupt ending the main faults.

References

External links 
 .

Adventure games
1989 video games
Atari ST games
DOS games
Amiga games
Video games developed in France
Piko Interactive games
Post-apocalyptic video games
Video games scored by Stéphane Picq